Aadil Rashid (born 10 March 1990) is an Indian cricketer. He made his List A debut on 27 February 2021, for Jammu and Kashmir in the 2020–21 Vijay Hazare Trophy.

References

External links
 

1990 births
Living people
Indian cricketers
Jammu and Kashmir cricketers
Place of birth missing (living people)